Dirk Raudies (born June 17, 1964) is a German former Grand Prix motorcycle road racer, specialising in 125cc. Born in Biberach an der Riß, Germany, his greatest success on the racetrack came in 1993 when he won the 125cc Grand Prix world championship on a Honda RS125R.

Since 2004, Raudies has been a television motorsport commentator at Eurosport. From 2004 - 2008 he commentated alongside Ron Ringguth for MotoGP and since 2009 for Superbike World Championship with Lenz Leberkern.

Grand Prix career statistics
Points system from 1988 to 1992:

Points system from 1993 onwards:

(key) (Races in bold indicate pole position; races in italics indicate fastest lap)

References

External links
Dirk Raudies biography (German)

1964 births
Living people
People from Biberach an der Riss
Sportspeople from Tübingen (region)
German motorcycle racers
125cc World Championship riders
Porsche Supercup drivers
Motorsport announcers
125cc World Riders' Champions